Happy Happy Birthday To Me Records is an American independent record label based in Athens, Georgia. Its catalogue features indie rock, indie pop and hip-hop music, with several of its artists associated with or influenced by The Elephant 6 Recording Company.

History
The label began as a compilation album, Happy Happy Birthday To Me Volume 1, before it expanded into a 7" singles club, which released records by Of Montreal, Marshmallow Coast, The Essex Green, Great Lakes, and Masters of the Hemisphere, while also releasing several tape and CD compilations. The singles club was noted for its individuality, with each individual record by an artist often being different. For example, each copy of The Essex Green's single came with a different original photograph on the sleeve, while Marshmallow Coast's were hand-drawn by school children. The label then began to release full-length CDs for the first time, the first of these being Birddog's A Sweet and Bitter Fancy. The label also continued to release 7"s, compilations and T-shirts, as well as a video compilation DVD, and a further singles club featuring Bunnygrunt, Casper and the Cookies, and Andy From Denver. There are currently over nearly 200 releases on the label, and an even larger catalog of distributed titles. Today, its catalog has expanded to span several genres.

Happy Happy Birthday To Me Records founder Mike Turner also founded the annual Athens Popfest, which routinely featured many of the bands on the label's roster, as well as many Elephant 6 artists, other Athens luminaries, and national artists. 2005's Popfest was headlined by bands including Pylon, Circulatory System and of Montreal. The 2006 Popfest featured headliners Deerhoof, The Apples in Stereo, The Mountain Goats and Circulatory System. The 2007 Popfest lineup included Daniel Johnston (backed by Athens band Casper and the Cookies) and Ted Leo. Athens Popfest 2007 is most remembered as the breakout performance for Jacksonville band Black Kids, resulting in a storm of blogs, interviews, and international magazine write-ups. Popfest 2008 was headlined by Roky Erickson, Elf Power and, in a rare and much-anticipated performance, The Music Tapes. 2010 included Mission of Burma, The Wedding Present, and Apples in Stereo. 2011 featured Throwing Muses, Bob Mould, Oh OK, Olivia Tremor Control, Man or Astro-Man?, and the Dead Milkmen. The festival's return in 2016 featured Deerhoof, Love Tractor, Ought, Shopping, and Elf Power. Popfest 2017 was headlined by The Apples in stereo, ESG, Laetitia Sadier, and Superchunk. The 2018 event was headlined by The Mummies, Man or Astro-man?, Ex Hex, Dean Wareham, His Name Is Alive, and Guided By Voices.

Roster

Active
Cowtown
 Eureka California
 The Flatmates
 Fred Schneider & The Superions
 His Name Is Alive
 Joe Jack Talcum
 Linqua Franqa
 Magnapop
 Marshmallow Coast
 Noon:30
 Rat Fancy
 Skinny Girl Diet
 The Primitives
 The Wedding Present
 Tullycraft
 Wesdaruler

Inactive
 
 Keith John Adams
 Afternoon Naps
 Antlered Aunt Lord
 AqPop
 Ashley Park
 Ryan Anderson
 Baby Calendar
 Bam! Bam!
 Bastards of Fate
 Bearsuit
 Birddog
 Boyracer
 Bunnygrunt
 Calvin, Don't Jump!
 Cars Can Be Blue
 Casper & the Cookies
 Elekibass
 The Ethical Debating Society
 Eux Autres
 Fablefactory
 Fishboy
 Flash To Bang Time
 Flink
 Forever
 The Gwens
 The High Water Marks
 Hotpants Romance
 Hug Abuse
 The Ideal Free Distribution
 Joanna Gruesome
 Kingsauce
 The Loch Ness Mouse
 Lolligags
 The Love Letter Band
 The Lovely Eggs
 Try the Pie
 Muuy Bien
 Neutral Milk Hotel
 Oh Ok
 Orca Team
 Patience Please
 Red Pony Clock
 Russian Spy Camera
 Sarandon
 The Smittens
 Smokedog
 Sourpatch
 Starbag
 Suggested Friends
 Sweater Girls
 Titans of Filth
 Tunabunny
 Velcro Stars
 Visitations
 Witching Waves

Discography

 HHBTM 001 - Various Happy Happy Birthday To Me Volume 1 (CD, Comp, Ltd) 1999	
 HHBTM002 - Kingsauce - Singles Club #1 (7", Ltd) 1999	
 HHBTM003 - Marshmallow Coast - Singles Club #2 (7", Ltd) 1999	
 HHBTM 004 - of Montreal - Singles Club #3 (7", Single, Ltd, Num) 1999	
 HHBTM 005 - Various Hey, It's My Birthday (Cass, Comp, Ltd) 1999	
 HHBTM 007 - Vince Mole & His Calcium Orchestra - Singles Club #4 (7", Ltd, Num) 2000	
 HHBTM008 - Plastic Mastery - Singles Club #5 (7", Single, Ltd) 2000	
 HHBTM 009 - The Princeton Reverbs Colonial - Singles Club #6 (7", Single, Ltd) 2000	
 HHBTM010 - Great Lakes - Singles Club #7 (7", Ltd) 2000	
 HHBTM013 - Flink - Have You Seen Me? (Cass, MiniAlbum) 2000  
 HHBTM015 - Essex Green - Singles Club #8 (7", Single, Ltd)	2000	
 HHBTM016 - Masters Of The Hemisphere	Silence, Raindrops (7", Single, Ltd) 2000	
 HHBTM017 - Various Happy Happy Birthday To Me Volume 2 (CD, Comp, Ltd) 2002	
 HHBTM 019 - The Gwens / Breezy Porticos (7") 2000	
 HHBTM 020 - Blue Period / Golden Synthetic Songbook (7", Single, Ltd)	2000	
 HHBTM 021 - Black Swan Network Singles Club #10 (7", Ltd)	2000	
 HHBTM022 - Calvin, Don't Jump! Singles Club #11 (7", Single, Ltd, Num) 2000	
 HHBTM 023 - The Late B.P. Helium Singles Club #12 (7", Ltd) 2000	
 HHBTM024 - Various HHBTM Singles Club (Bonus Bag Edition) (Box, Ltd, S/Edition + 12x7", Ltd)	2000	
 HHBTM024 - Various Singles Club Bonus Tape (Cass, Comp, Ltd) 2000	
 HHBTM025 - Various HHBTM Singles Club (Box, Ltd, Car + 12x7", Ltd) 2000	
 HHBTM026 - Birddog - A Sweet And Bitter Fancy (CD, Album, Ltd) 2001	
 HHBTM032 - The Gwens - Devil's Cliff (CD, Album) 2001	
 HHBTM033 - Visitations - Visitations (CD, Album) 2001	
 HHBTM 034 - Vince Mole & His Calcium Orchestra - Kevin Whiskey 35 (7", Single, Ltd) 2002	
 HHBTM 035 - The Loch Ness Mouse Flair - For Darjeeling (CD, Album, Ltd) 2001	
 HHBTM036 - Elekibass - California (CD, MiniAlbum) 2006	
 HHBTM 037 - Kingsauce - Please Don't Change The Channel (CD, Album) 2002	
 HHBTM038 - Red Pony Clock - Red Pony Clock (7", Red) 2003	
 HHBTM039 - Fablefactory - We Won't Rock You (CD, Comp) 2002	
 HHBTM040 - The Loch Ness Mouse - Key West (CD, Album)	2002	
 HHBTM041 - 63 Crayons - Spread The Love EP (CD, MiniAlbum) 2002	
 HHBTM042 - Elekibass / Quinka With A Yawn (CD, MiniAlbum) 2003	
 HHBTM043 - The Orchid Pool - Imaginary Instruments EP (7", EP) 2002	
 HHBTM044 - Fablefactory - Freak Out Hard On You (Album) 2002	
 HHBTM045 - Carrots - Sunshine (CD, Album) 2001	
 HHBTM 046 - Calvin, Don't Jump! - Solamente La Luna Esta Noche (7", Ltd) 2002	
 HHBTM047 - Calvin, Don't Jump! - A Way With Birds (CD, Album)	2002	
 HHBTM048 - Various - Paisley And Twee (CD) 2002	
 HHBTM 049 - Birddog - Songs From Willipa Bay (CD, Album) 2002	
 HHBTM 050 - Various - Happy Happy Birthday To Me Vol. 3 (CD, Comp, Ltd) 2004	
 HHBTM052 - Star Bag - Star Bag (CD, Album) 2003	
 HHBTM 054 - Ashley Park - The Secretariat Motor Hotel (CD, Album) 2003	
 HHBTM055 - 63 Crayons - Good People (CD) 2004	
 HHBTM056 - The Danny Says - The Danny Says (CDr, Album, Ltd) 2005	
 HHBTM 057 - Snoozer	Winter - Stops All Sound (CD, EP) 2003	
 HHBTM058 - Casper & The Cookies - Oh! (CD, Album) 2003	
 HHBTM059 - Bunnygrunt - Karen Hater's Club (Album) 2005	
 HHBTM060 - Bugs Eat Books	Ghosts Of Leaves (CD, Album) 2005	
 HHBTM061 - Men In Fur	Men In Fur (CD, Album) 2004	
 HHBTM062 - Big City - A Spring Of Summers (CD, Album)	2003	
 HHBTM063 - Boyracer - Happenstance (CD, Album) 2004	
 HHBTM063LP - Boyracer - Happenstance (LP, Album, Ltd, Fab) 2009	
 HHBTM064 - AqPop - Beautifully Smart (CD, Album) 2004	
 HHBTM065 - The Love Letter Band - Fear Not My Brothers, Fear Not My Sisters, For I Have Seen The Future And These Dark Clouds Will Part (CD, Album) 2006	
 HHBTM066 - Various - No Parachute - A Compilation Of Indie Music Videos (DVD) 2005	
 HHBTM067 - Elekibass - Welcome Wonderful World (CD, Comp) 2006	
 HHBTM068 - Boyracer - It's Not True Grit, It's Real Dirt (7", EP, Ltd, Dou) 2005	
 HHBTM069 - Cars Can Be Blue - All The Stuff We Do (CD, Album)	2005	
 HHBTM069LP - Cars Can Be Blue - All The Stuff We Do (Album) 2009	
 HHBTM070 - Keith John - Adams	Pip (CD, Album)	2005	
 HHBTM071 - Various	Singles Club 1999-2000 (2xCDr, Comp, Ltd)	2006	
 HHBTM072 - Russian Spy Camera - You Are A Vulture (CD, Album)	2006	
 HHBTM073 - Casper & The Cookies - The Optimist's Club (CD, Album)	2006	
 HHBTM073PR - Casper & The Cookies - Overly Optimistic (CDr, MiniAlbum, Ltd)	2006	
 HHBTM074 - Baby Calendar - Gingerbread Dog (CD, Album) 2006	
 HHBTM075 - Ryan Anderson - The Garden Path (CD, Album) 2007	
 HHBTM076 - Various - HHBTM Records CMJ Sampler 2006 (CDr, Smplr) 2006	
 HHBTM077A - The Maybellines - Our Secret Lives (CDr, EP) 2007	
 HHBTM077B - Zuno Men - People (CDr, Album, RE) 2007	
 HHBTM077C - The Gift Machine - CD-R EP Club (CDr, EP)	2007	
 HHBTM077D - The Ocelots - CD-R EP Club (CDr, EP) 2007	
 HHBTM077E - Titans Of Filth - CD-R EP Club (CDr, EP) 2007	
 HHBTM077F - The Passerines - CD-R EP Club (CDr, EP) 2007	
 HHBTM077G - The Faintest Ideas - Your Imaginary Bullets Really Hurt (CDr, EP, Ltd) 2007	
 HHBTM077H - Pegasuses XL - CD-R EP Club (CDr, EP) 2007	
 HHBTM078 - M Coast - Say It In Slang (Album) 2006	
 HHBTM080 - Various - Hey, It's My Birthday (CDr, Comp, RE) 2006	
 HHBTM081 - Ideal Free Distribution - Ideal Free Distribution (CD, Album) 2007	
 HHBTM 082 - Velcro Stars - Hiroshima's Revenge (CD, Album) 2007	
 HHBTM083 - Sarandon - The Completist's Library (CD, Album) 2006	
 HHBTM086 - The Instruments - Joy Division Covers (7", Single, Ltd + CDr) 2007	
 HHBTM087 - The Lolligags - "Wired" (CD, EP) 2007	
 HHBTM088 - Various - Happy Happy Birthday To Me Vol. 4 (CD, Album, Comp, Ltd)	2007	
 HHBTM089 - Fishboy - Albatross: How We Failed To Save The Lone State With The Power Of Rock And Roll (CD, Album) 2007	
 HHBTM090 - The High Water Marks - Polar (CD, Album) 2007	
 HHBTM091 - The Keith John Adams - Unclever (CD, Album) 2008	
 HHBTM092 - Eux Autres - Cold City (CD, Album)	2007	
 HHBTM093 - Patience Please - Fleeting Frequencies (CD, Album)	2007	
 HHBTM094 - Red Pony Clock - God Made Dirt (CD, Album)	2007	
 HHBTM095 - SC13 - Sunshine Fix / Always Red Society	Happy Happy Birthday To Me 2007 Singles Club #13 (Single) 2009	
 HHBTM095 - SC1 - Fishboy / Baby Calendar - Happy Happy Birthday To Me 2007 Singles Club #1 (7", Ltd, Red) 2007	
 HHBTM095 - SC2 - Casper And The Cookies* / The Marbles (7", Ltd, Cle)	2007	
 HHBTM095 - SC3 - Bunnygrunt / Phil Wilson (7", Ltd) 2007	
 HHBTM095 - SC4 - Boyracer / Faintest Ideas - Happy Happy Birthday To Me 2007 Singles Club #4 (7", Ltd, Pin) 2007	
 HHBTM095 - SC5 - Tullycraft / The Smittens - On Tape / My Boyfriend's Back (7", Ltd, Yel) 2008	
 HHBTM095 - SC6 - Velcro Stars / Keith John Adams - Happy Happy Birthday To Me 2007 Singles Club #6 (7", Ltd, Blu) 2008	
 HHBTM095 - SC7 - Andy From Denver* / Red Pony Clock - Happy Happy Birthday To Me 2007 Singles Club #7 (7", Ltd, Gre)	2008	
 HHBTM095 - SC8 - Poison Control Center / Ideal Free Distribution - Happy Happy Birthday To Me 2007 Singles Club #8 (7", Ltd, Cle) 2008	
 HHBTM095 - SC9 - Apples In Stereo / Patience Please - Happy Happy Birthday To Me 2007 Singles Club #9 (7", Ltd, Gre)	2009	
 HHBTM095 - SC10 - All Girl Summer Fun Band / Cars Can Be Blue	- Happy Happy Birthday To Me 2007 Singles Club #10 (7", Ltd, Blu)	2009	
 HHBTM095-SC11 - of Montreal / James Husband - Wet Butcher's Fist / A Grave In The Gravel (7", Ltd, Pur) 2009	
 HHBTM095 - SC12 - High Water Marks* / Love Letter Band - Happy Happy Birthday To Me 2007 Singles Club #12 (7", Ltd, Bla) 2009	
 HHBTM096 - Various - Singles Club Special Bag (2xCDr, Comp, Ltd) 2009	
 HHBTM097 - Various - HHBTM Singles Club Distro Box (Box, Ltd + 12x7", Ltd) 2007	
 HHBTM098 - Bearsuit - Oh:Io (CD, Album) 2008	
 HHBTM099 - Casper & The Cookies - 3 1/2 Stars (CDr, EP, Ltd)	2007	
 HHBTM101CD - The Smittens - The Coolest Thing About Love (CD, Album) 2008	
 HHBTM101 - The Smittens - The Coolest Thing About Love (LP, Album) 2008	
 HHBTM102 - Cars Can Be Blue - Doubly Unbeatable (CD, Album) 2008	
 HHBTM102B - Cars Can Be Blue - All The Stuff We Don't (CD, Comp, Ltd)	2008	
 HHBTM103 - Hotpants Romance - It's A Heatwave (CD, Album) 2008	
 HHBTM104 - The Lolligags - Out Of Perversity Join Hands (CD, EP) 2009	
 HHBTM107 - Forever - Forever (CD, EP, Ltd) 2009	
 HHBTM108 - Marshmallow Coast - Phreak Phantasy (CD, Album) 2009	
 HHBTM108LP - Marshmallow Coast - Phreak Fantasy (LP, Album, Ltd) 2009	
 HHBTM109 - Casper & The Cookies - Modern Silence (CD, Album)	2009	
 HHBTM110 - Bunnygrunt - Matt Harnish & Other Delights (CD, Album) 2009	
 HHBTM110LP - Bunnygrunt - Matt Harnish & Other Delights (12", Album) 2009	
 HHBTM111 - Afternoon Naps - Parade (CD, Album) 2009	
 HHBTM111LP - Afternoon - Naps	Parade (LP, Album) 2009	
 HHBTM112 - The Lovely Eggs - If You Were Fruit (CD, Album)	2009	
 HHBTM 113 - Hulaboy + Tunabunny split (LP, Album, Ltd + CDr, Album, Ltd) 2009	
 HHBTM114 - Smokedog - Rogue Warriors (Cass, Comp, Ltd) 2009	
 HHBTM117 - The Superions - The Superions (CD, EP) 2010	
 HHBTM117LP - The Superions - The Superions (12", EP, Ltd) 2010	
 HHBTM118 - Sourpatch - Crushin' (CD, Album) 2010	
 HHBTM118LP - Sourpatch - Crushin' (Album) 2010	
 HHBTM119 - Sweater Girls - Do The Sweater (7", Ltd) 2010	
 HHBTM120 - Flash To Bang - Time Lead Balloon (7", Single, Ltd) 2010	
 HHBTM122 - Tunabunny - Tunabunny (LP)	2010	
 HHBTM122CS - Tunabunny - Tunabunny (Cass, Album, Ltd)	2010	
 HHBTM125 - Sourpatch - Mira Mija (7", EP, Ltd) 2010	
 HHBTM126 - Tunabunny - Don't Trust Whitey (Flexi, 7", EP, Ltd) 2010	
 HHBTM127 - Sweater Girls - Pretty When You Smile (7", Ltd) 2010	
 HHBTM128 - Afternoon Naps - Summer Gang (7", S/Sided, Ltd) 2011	
 HHBTM130 - Sweater Girls / Sourpatch	Split Cassette (Cass, Album, Ltd) 2011	
 HHBTM131 - Various	MC12: A Cassette Compilation (Cass, Comp) 2012	
 HHBTM134 - Eureka California - Modern Times (7", EP) 2011	
 HHBTM135 - Orca Team - Vancouver B.C. (7") 2011	
 HHBTM136 - Marshmallow Coast - Seniors & Juniors Strikes Back (CD, Album, Ltd) 2011	
 HHBTM137 - Fishboy - Classic Creeps (Album)  2011	
 HHBTM138 - Joe Jack Talcum - Home Recordings 1984 - 1990 (LP)	2011	
 HHBTM139 - Tunabunny - (Song For My) Solar Sister (7", Single, Ltd) 2011	
 HHBTM140 - Tunabunny - Minima Moralia (LP, Album) 2011	
 HHBTM141 - Oh-OK - The Complete Reissue (LP, Comp, Ltd, RE) 2011	
 HHBTM142 - Orca Team - Take My Hand (7", Ltd)	2011	
 HHBTM143 - Red Pony Clock - Whatevz Forevzzz (LP, Album) 2011	
 HHBTM144 - Sourpatch - Stagger & Fade (LP) 2012	
 HHBTM145 - Shrag / Tunabunny - Tendons In The Night / Locusts (7") 2012	
 HHBTM146 - Orca Team - Restraint (LP, Album) 2012	
 HHBTM146CD - Orca Team - Restraint (CD, Album, Ltd)	2012	
 HHBTM147 - Sweater Girls - Sweater Girls Were Here (Album, LP) 2012	
 HHBTM148CS - Eureka California - Big Cats Can Swim (Cass, Album, Ltd)	2012	
 HHBTM148LP - Eureka California - Big Cats Can Swim (LP, Album) 2012	
 HHBTM149 - Joanna Gruesome - Do You Really Wanna Know Why Yr Still In Love With Me? (7") 2012	
 HHBTM150 - Tunabunny - Genius Fatigue (Album) 2012	
 HHBTM151 - Bam! Bam! - Golden Haze 2 (7") 2013	
 HHBTM152 - Muuy Biien	This Is What Your Mind Imagines (Album) 2012	
 HHBTM153 - Eureka California / Good Grief (7") 2013	
 HHBTM154 - Tunabunny - Form A Line EP (12", EP) 2013	
 HHBTM155 - Cars Can Be Blue - Trace The Tension (Album) 2013	
 HHBTM156 - Skinny Girl Diet / Ethical Debating Society (7", EP) 2013	
 HHBTM157 - Week Of Wonders - Piggybacks (7", Single, Ltd) 2013	
 HHBTM159 - Tunabunny - Kingdom Technology (Album) 2014	
 HHBTM160 - Muuy Biien	D.Y.I. (Album) 2014	
 HHBTM161 - Eureka California - Crunch (Album)  2014	
 HHBTM162 - Joe Jack Talcum - Home Recording's 1993 - 99 (LP, Comp) 2014	
 HHBTM163 - Crayon - Brick Factory (LP) 2014	
 HHBTM164 - Throwing Muses - Purgatory/Paradise (Album) 2014	
 HHBTM165 - Trust Fund / Joanna Gruesome (EP) 2014	
 HHBTM166CD - Marshmallow Coast - Vangelis Rides Again (CD) 2015	
 HHBTM166LP - Marshmallow Coast - Vangelis Rides Again (LP) 2015	
 HHBTM167 - Noon:30 - Finding Release (12", EP) 2015	
 HHBTM168 - Bunnygrunt - Vol 4 (LP, Album) 2015	
 HHBTM169 - Try The Pie - Rest (LP, Album) 2015  
 HHBTM170 - Antlered Auntlord - Ostensibly Formerly Stunted (And On Fire) (LP, Album) 2015	
 HHBTM171 - Two White Cranes - Radisson Blue (Cass, Album) 2015	
 HHBTM172 - Crunchy - Crunchy EP (Cass, EP, Ltd) 2015	
 HHBTM173 - Witching Waves - Crystal Cafe (Album) 2016	
 HHBTM174 - Eureka California	Versus (LP, Album) 2016	
 HHBTM174b -Eureka California - Demos, Lost Tracks, And Stuff (Cass, Comp, Ltd) 2016	
 HHBTM 175 - Cinerama - Valentina (Album) 2016	
 HHBTM176 - The Wedding Present - Take Fountain (Album) 2016	
 HHBTM179 - 50 Foot Wave - Bath White (EP) 2016	
 HHBTM180 - Clem Snide - You Were A Diamond (Album) 2016	
 HHBTM181 - Cowtown - Paranormal Romance (Album) 2016	
 HHBTM 182 - The Wedding Present - Going, Going... (Album) 2016	
 HHBTM183 - Skinny Girl Diet - Heavy Flow (LP, Album)	2016	
 HHBTM 184 - Eureka California - Wigwam (7") 2017	
 HHBTM185 - The Bastards Of Fate - Suck The Light Out (LP, Album) 2017	
 HHBTM186 - Kristin Hersh - Wyatt At The Coyote Palace (2xLP) 2017	
 HHBTM187 - Fred Schneider & The Superions - The Vertical Mind (Album) 2017	
 HHBTM188 - Tunabunny - PCP Presents Alice In Wonderland Jr. (2xLP, Album) 2017	
 HHBTM189 - Rat Fancy	Suck A Lemon (EP) 2017
 HHBTM190 - The Wedding Present - George Best 30  (LP, Album) 2017	
 HHBTM191 - Linqua Franqa - Model Minority (LP, Album) 2018	
 HHBTM193CD - Eureka California - Roadrunners (CD, Album) 2018	
 HHBTM193LP - Eureka California - Roadrunners (LP, Album) 2018	
 HHBTM194 - Fred Schneider & The Superions - Head On A Leg (7") 2018	
 HHBTM195 - Marshmallow Coast - Memory Girl (LP, Album) 2018	
 HHBTM196 - Tullycraft - The Railway Prince Hotel (CD, Album) 2019	
 HHBTM196LP - Tullycraft - The Railway Prince Hotel (LP, Album) 2019	
 HHBTM197 - Skinny Girl Diet - Ideal Woman (LP, Album)	2019
 HHBTM198 - Rat Fancy - Stay Cool (LP, Album) 2019
 HHBTM199 - Magnapop – The Circle Is Round (LP, Album) 2019
 HHBTM200 - Fred Schneider and the Superions – Bat Baby (7") 2019
 HHBTM201 - WesdaRuler – Ocean Drive (LP, Album) 2019
 HHBTM202 - Suggested Friends – Turtle Taxi (LP, Album) 2019
 HHBTM203 - Wedding Present – Tommy 30 (LP, Album) 2019
 HHBTM223 - The Primitives - Don’t Know Where To Start (EP) 2023

See also
 List of record labels

References

External links
 Official site
 Quotes About Happy Birthday To Me

American independent record labels
Indie pop record labels